Gajanan Vijay (Marathi: गजानन विजय) is a spiritual book written in Marathi language by Saint Shree Dasganu. It outlines the events in the life of Saint Gajanan Maharaj. It contains 21 chapters and thousands of verses. Many devotees read this book and it has been translated in many other Indian Languages like Hindi, Kannada, Telugu.

External links
 Shri Gajanan Vijay Granth App
 Shri Gajanan Vijay Granth 

Marathi-language literature